Giuseppe Besozzi (born 1686 in Milan – died 2 December 1760 in Naples) was an Italian oboist. In the eighteenth century the Besozzi family produced several important oboists who worked in Turin, Naples, London, Paris and Dresden. Giuseppe's brothers Alessandro Besozzi and Paolo Girolamo Besozzi lived in Turin, and his sons Antonio Besozzi in Naples and Gaetano Besozzi in Paris and London. Antonio Besozzi's son Carlo Besozzi worked in Dresden and Gaetano's son Girolamo Besozzi, the grandfather of the composer Louis Désiré Besozzi, worked in Paris.

The eldest son of Cristoforo Besozzi came to Parma in 1701, where he was trained as an oboist. He became a member of the Ducal hautboy band Guardia Irlandese, created in 1702 by Antonio Farnese, Duke of Parma, on 1 June 1711. In 1728 he was appointed virtuoso suonatore di oboe di SAS at the court of the prince. In 1734 he was assigned to the court of the King of Naples, where he worked until 1738 at the age of 52, probably leaving due to problems with his eyes. Thereafter, he devoted himself to teaching.

Notes

References

Attribution
This article is based on the translation of the corresponding article of the German Wikipedia. A list of contributors can be found there at the History section.

1686 births
1760 deaths
Italian oboists
Male oboists
Musicians from Milan